Volunteer was an American racing yacht built in 1887 for the America's Cup races. She was the victorious American defender of the seventh America's Cup match that same year against Scottish challenger Thistle.

Design
Volunteer, a centerboard compromise sloop, was designed by Edward Burgess, built by Pusey & Jones Shipbuilding Company at Wilmington, Delaware and launched after 66 days under construction on June 30, 1887 for owner General Charles J. Paine of the New York Yacht Club.

Volunteer was the first America's Cup yacht with an all steel frame and hull. Her deck was made of white pine.

After the races Volunteer was modified to serve as a cruising schooner. The yacht then had a large cabin and seven staterooms with three toilets. The crew was composed of four officers and eight men. The registry information for 1901—1902 shows , 99.88 Net tons,  length overall,  waterline length,  beam with owner being J. Malcolm Forbes with home port of Boston.

Career
Volunteer easily beat the 1886 America's Cup defender Mayflower during the defender trials for the 1887 America's Cup and won both Cup races on September 27 and 30, 1887, against Thistle. Volunteer was skippered by Captain Hank Haff with the assistance of Captains Terry, Berry and L. Jeffreys.

Soon after the Cup races, Volunteer was bought by John Malcolm Forbes (who also owned Puritan) and was Re-rigged as a schooner in 1891. On August 21, 1893 she went onto the rocks at Hadley's Harbor, Naushon Island, off the coast of Massachusetts. Damage was extensive, as shown in the picture below. In 1894, in anticipation of racing with the British Valkyrie, she was returned to her original sloop rig. She was broken up at a New York junkyard in 1910.

References

External links
America's Cup's Ac-clopaedia
The 19th Century Yacht Photography of J.S. Johnston

America's Cup defenders
Individual sailing vessels
Yachts of New York Yacht Club members
Ships built by Pusey and Jones
1887 in sports